Miotto is an Italian surname. Notable people with the surname include:

 Geraldo Antônio Miotto (1955–2021), Brazilian general
 Simon Miotto (born 1959), Australian footballer

Italian-language surnames